Karin Johanna Immergut (born December 22, 1960) is an American lawyer and jurist serving as a United States district judge of the United States District Court for the District of Oregon.

Early life and education 

Immergut was born in Brooklyn, New York, on December 22, 1960. Her father was an Austrian chemist and her mother a Swedish mathematician. Her parents married in Sweden and then immigrated to the United States where Karin was born.

Immergut graduated from Amherst College in 1982 with a Bachelor of Arts. From 1982 to 1984, Immergut was a special assistant at the New York City Departments of Juvenile Justice and Corrections. She then attended the UC Berkeley School of Law, where she was managing editor of the Boalt Hall Journal of Industrial Relations (now Berkeley Journal of Employment & Labor Law). She graduated with a Juris Doctor in 1987.

Career 
After law school she worked as a litigation associate at the law firm of Covington & Burling in Washington, D.C. for one year.

Following private practice, Immergut served as an assistant United States attorney for the Central District of California in Los Angeles for six years. During her tenure in the Central District of California, Immergut prosecuted several large-scale complex narcotics and money laundering cases and served as a deputy chief of the Narcotics Section and chief of the Training Section. She then moved to Burlington, Vermont, to work for the firm Gravel & Shea for two years.

Immergut served for five years as a deputy district attorney in Portland, Oregon, where she primarily prosecuted white collar crimes. In 1998, Immergut was a Multnomah County deputy district attorney and a longtime Democrat when she went to work for Independent Counsel Kenneth Starr, who was investigating then-President Bill Clinton. She re-registered as an independent upon taking that position. Immergut personally questioned Monica Lewinsky in an August 6, 1998, deposition. In 2001, she joined the U.S. Attorney's office in Portland as an assistant U.S. attorney in the District of Oregon. Serving two years in the position, she prosecuted cases involving white collar crime and worked on Project Safe Neighborhoods, a national gun violence reduction initiative.

U.S. attorney 

Immergut was sworn in as interim United States attorney on October 3, 2003, and the United States Senate confirmed her nomination on that same date. She was appointed by President George W. Bush to the position. Bush signed her commission to serve as the United States Attorney for the District of Oregon on October 4, 2003, and she was sworn in as the United States Attorney on October 8, 2003. She succeeded Michael W. Mosman in that role.

As U.S. Attorney, Immergut served as the district's top federal law enforcement official. She managed a staff of approximately 107 people, including 51 assistant U.S. attorneys, who handled civil litigation on behalf of the United States and criminal investigations and prosecutions involving violations of federal law such as white collar crime, narcotics trafficking, violent crime, money laundering and cybercrime. In addition, Immergut served on the Advisory Committee of U.S. Attorneys.

In January 2008, Immergut applied to succeed Judge Garr King on the United States District Court for Oregon. She was initially considered the leading candidate for the post as the preferred choice of U.S. Senator Gordon H. Smith. But after news reports highlighting her role in the investigation of President Bill Clinton's sex scandal, she was not one of the final candidates for the position, which ultimately Marco A. Hernandez was appointed to. She re-registered as a Republican at the beginning of Bush's first term as President, in the same month that she went to work for Mosman. She resigned from the office in July 2009 in order to be appointed as Multnomah County Circuit Court Judge.

Federal judicial service 

On June 7, 2018, President Donald Trump announced his intent to nominate Immergut to serve as a United States district judge for the United States District Court for the District of Oregon. On June 11, 2018, her nomination was sent to the Senate. President Trump nominated Immergut to the seat vacated by Judge Anna J. Brown, who assumed senior status on July 27, 2017. On October 24, 2018, a hearing on her nomination was held before the Senate Judiciary Committee.

On January 3, 2019, her nomination was returned to the President under Rule XXXI, Paragraph 6 of the United States Senate. On January 23, 2019, President Trump announced his intent to renominate Immergut for a federal judgeship. Her nomination was sent to the Senate later that day. On February 7, 2019, her nomination was reported out of committee by a 20–2 vote. On July 31, 2019, the Senate confirmed her nomination by voice vote. She received her judicial commission on August 5, 2019.

Personal life 
In 1996 Immergut moved to Portland, Oregon, where she married James T. McDermott and was hired by Multnomah County.

References

External links 

 Karin Immergut at Ballotpedia

|-

|-

1960 births
Living people
20th-century American lawyers
21st-century American lawyers
21st-century American judges
American people of Austrian descent
American people of Swedish descent
Amherst College alumni
Assistant United States Attorneys
California Democrats
George W. Bush administration personnel
Judges of the United States District Court for the District of Oregon
Lawyers from Brooklyn
Lawyers from Portland, Oregon
Obama administration personnel
Oregon Democrats
Oregon Independents
Oregon Republicans
Oregon state court judges
State attorneys
United States Attorneys for the District of Oregon
United States district court judges appointed by Donald Trump
UC Berkeley School of Law alumni
Vermont Democrats
Women in Oregon politics
20th-century American women lawyers
21st-century American women lawyers
21st-century American women judges